Aldoma is a rural locality (an electric utility post) in Ayano-Maysky District of Khabarovsk Krai, Russia, located at the western entrance of Aldoma Bay in the western Sea of Okhotsk.

Rural localities in Khabarovsk Krai